Yanji No.1 Senior High School, commonly abbreviated as Yanji Shi Yizhong, is a Provincial Key High School in Yanji, Yanbian, Jilin, China. It was established in 1915.

History 

Yanji Daoli No.2 Middle School, the predecessor of Yanji No.1 Senior High School, was founded in 1906. The school at that time was consisted of 60 Siheyuan buildings. In 1920, Yanji Daoli No.2 Middle School merged with Yanji Daoli Normal School, and established Jilin Province No.4 Normal School.

In 1934, the school was renamed as Yanji Normal School, which was subsequently divided into Jiandao Provincial National College, Jiandao Provincial Normal School and Jiandao Provincial Women's National College in 1938.

After the restoration of Yanji, Wei Jinchen presided over the transformation of Jiandao Provincial No.2 National College into Yanji Two-level Secondary School, which merged with Jiandao Provincial Women's National College into Yanji No.1 Junior High School ( in 1946. In 1949, in order to cultivate the urgently needed talents in regime construction and economic construction for the country, the school and Yanji No.2 Junior High School opened their respective worker-peasant cadre culture classes. In 1963, the school was renamed as Yanji No.1 Middle School, and began to recruit students in the senior high school stage because of the restructuring.

In March 1978, Yanji No.1 Middle School was honored as a Provincial Key High School. In 1988, the school was renamed to the current name (Yanji No.1 Senior High School).

Honors 
Yanji No.1 Senior High School was honored as a Provincial Key High School in March 1978. In 2001, Yanji No.1 Senior High School was identified as a Management Sequence School of Key Ordinary High Schools in Jilin Province by the People's Government of Jilin Province. Yanji No. 1 Senior High School was listed as one of the historical culture sites in Yanji City in September 2018.

References 

Educational institutions established in 1915
1915 establishments in China
High schools in Jilin